Association Ukrainian Agribusiness Club, also UCAB, is a Kyiv-based Ukrainian non-governmental organization, lobbying agribusiness interests. Dr. Alex Lissitsa serves as a president of UCAB.

The main UCAB activities include:
 Training and research
 Lobbying
 Work with Media
 Participation and organization of trade fairs and exhibitions

Since its formation in 2007, Ukrainian Agribusiness Club quickly became the most quoted organization in the agricultural sector of Ukrainian economy.

References

External links 
 Association Ukrainian Agribusiness Club

Agriculture in Ukraine
Business organizations based in Ukraine